IESF - Instituto de Estudos Superios de Fafe is an institute of higher education formed in 1985 in Fafe, Portugal.

Faculties 
School of Education:
 Bachelor's degrees
 Elementary Education, Physical Education and Sports, Senior Education
 Master's degrees
 Preschool Education, Education in Elementary School
 Postgraduate
 Special Education-cognitive-motor domain, 
 Nursery - Development, Education and Care, 
Physical Activity in Gerontology, 
Fitness center activities and Exersice Prescription

School of Technology
 Bachelor's degrees
 Informatics Management
 Accounting
 Tourism
 Management

See also
List of colleges and universities in Portugal
Higher education in Portugal

External links
Institute of Higher Studies of Fafe

Higher education in Portugal